Thomas Charles Kaufman is an American geneticist. He is known for his work on the zeste-white region of the Drosophila X chromosome. He is  currently a Distinguished Professor of biology at Indiana University, where he conducts his current research on Homeotic Genes in evolution and development.

Early life and education 
Kaufman enrolled in California State University at Northridge in 1962. There he joined the laboratory of George Lefevre. This inspired Kaufman to pursue a career in genetics and to use the Drosophila as his model system of choice. Kaufman attained his Ph.D from the University of Texas in 1970. While there he did his graduate work with Burke Judd. His work focused on saturation mutagenesis as well as the developmental genetics of the Zeste- White region of the Drosophila X Chromosome. This research became a classic study in genetics. The purpose was to test the “one gene – one chromosome” hypothesis. Their results helped to estimate the size of the Drosophila genome long before gene sequencing was a thing. Kaufman went on to join David Suzuki’s group at the University of British Columbia. He served as a postdoctoral associate, and their research involved temperature sensitive mutations.

Research and career 

After one year of research with David Suzuki, Kaufman became an individual researcher in Vancouver. During this time, Kaufman began his collaboration with Rob Denell that focused on a set of mutations that caused dominant defects in the fly’s head and anterior thorax. In 1983, Kaufman became an associate professor at Indiana University, where he remains. It was during this time that Kaufman defined the antennapedia gene complex. He discovered that this cluster of genes controlled the anterior segments in the embryo and adults. Kaufman broadened his work to examine the HOX gene (homeotic gene clusters) in insects. Kaufman went on to found and design FlyBase, which is a database that organizes data on the Drosophila. Kaufman also helped to establish the Bloomington Drosophila Stick Center and the Drosophila Genomics Resource Center. Kaufman's current research still heavily involves the HOX gene. He is currently interested in proteome changes in the head of the aging Drosophila.  In his personal statement for the National Academy of Sciences he states that "The goal of my laboratory is to contribute to an understanding of the genetic regulation development of higher organisms. The homeotic (Hox) genes of Drosophila melanogaster have been our principal focus. Homeotic lesions cause one portion of the animal to be transformed into an identity normally found elsewhere. The role of the Hox genes is best viewed as a set of developmental switches for decisions of segmental fate. The encoded homeodomain has shown that this switch activity is carried out through the transcriptional regulation of target genes." He has expanded his research from Drosophila to include several other insects and members of other subphylums under the phylum Arthopoda, such as Crustacea, Chelicerata and Myriapoda. He uses the technique of RNA-mediated gene inhibition (RNAi) to study the evolution of the HOX gene.

Awards and honors 
 2010- , Chairman, National Drosophila Board
 2008, Member, National Academy of Science
 2007, Member, American Association for the Advancement of Science
 2005, George W. Beadle Medal
 1999, Member, Fellow of the American Academy of Arts and Sciences
 1998, Conklin Medalist
 1993, Distinguished Professor of Biology at Indiana University
 Member, Genetics Society of America
 Member, Drosophila Genome Project

References 

Year of birth missing (living people)
Living people
California State University, Northridge alumni
University of Texas alumni
University of British Columbia alumni
Indiana University faculty
21st-century American biologists
American geneticists
21st-century American educators
Members of the United States National Academy of Sciences
Fellows of the American Academy of Arts and Sciences